Nexif Energy is a Singapore-based company that owns and operates wind farms and other renewable energy projects in several countries. It is a joint venture of Nexif and Denham Capital founded in August 2015.

Power sources

In August 2019, Nexif took up a 25-year lease of the Temporary Generation North consisting of five open cycle gas turbines in South Australia, with the lease taking effect from May 2020. The generators will be relocated by Nexif to a new site at Outer Harbor and converted to operate on natural gas before the end of 2020. Nexif also proposes to convert them to combined cycle with a steam turbine in the following few years.

References

Companies of Singapore
Renewable resource companies established in 2015